Joseph Harwar (12 November 1654, Stoke, Warwickshire – 15 July 1722, Oxford) was an English  academic.

Harwar was educated at Magdalen College, Oxford, where he was then a fellow from 1681 to 1706. He was  Magdalen's President from 1706 until his death. He was vicar of Lockington from 1687 to 1692, and rector of St Clement's, Oxford from 1696.

References

1672 births
1722 deaths
People from Warwickshire
Alumni of Magdalen College, Oxford
Fellows of Magdalen College, Oxford
Presidents of Magdalen College, Oxford